Dancing Spree (May 7, 1985 – February 6, 2011) was an American Thoroughbred racehorse and the winner of the 1990 Carter Handicap.

Career

Dancing Spree's first race was on April 20, 1988, where he won at Keeneland Racecourse. His next win came weeks later on May 14th, 1988 at Churchill Downs. He spent most of 1988 competing in allowance races.

He won his first Handicap, the Churchill Downs Stakes, on May 6, 1989. He placed in third at the 1989 Metropolitan Handicap then picked up summer victories in both the 1989 True North Stakes and the 1989 Suburban Handicap.

His next victory was on November 4, 1989 when he closed out the year by capturing the Breeders' Cup Sprint.

In his final year of racing at age five, Dancing Spree started it off with a win on February 4, 1990 in the Gulfstream Park Sprint Championship. He then got his last win on May 5, 1990 in the Carter Handicap. He attempted to capture the 1990 edition of the Breeders' Cup Sprint, but came in 6th. He then finished his career with a second place finish at the November 3, 1990, NYRA Mile Handicap.

Pedigree

References

1985 racehorse births
2011 racehorse deaths